Beulah McGillicutty a female wrestler in 1995 to 2009
Dale McGillicutty a Teenage Mutant Ninja Turtles character in 1988-1989
Elroy McGillicutty, a character in the 2006 season of Supernatural (TV series))
Michael McGillicutty a male wrestler in NXT then WWE from 2010 to 2012, now known as Curtis Axel.

See also
McGillicuddy, a similar surname